Abraham Schöpfer (fl. 16th century) was a German Northern Renaissance painter.

His best known work is probably Mucius Scaevola before King Porsena, from 1533, a scene based on Roman legend from the time of the birth of Rome (around 509 BC).

References

German painters
German male painters
Year of birth missing
Year of death missing